The 2014–15 CSKA season was the 23rd successive season that CSKA played in the Russian Premier League, the highest tier of association football in Russia. CSKA finished the season in second place, failing to defend their 2012–13 title, were knocked out of the Russian Cup by Kuban Krasnodar in the Semifinals, the Champions League at the group stage and won the Russian Super Cup against FC Rostov.

Season events
On 27 August, CSKA announced that Dzagoev had signed a new contract until the summer of 2019.

Squad

Transfers

In

Out

Loans out

Released

Friendlies

Competitions

Super Cup

Premier League

Results by round

Matches

League table

Russian Cup

UEFA Champions League

Group stage

Squad statistics

Appearances and goals

|-
|colspan="14"|Players away from the club on loan:

|-
|colspan="14"|Players who left CSKA Moscow during the season:

|}

Goal scorers

Disciplinary record

Notes
Notes

 MSK time changed from UTC+4 to UTC+3 permanently on 26 October 2014.

References

PFC CSKA Moscow seasons
CSKA Moscow
CSKA Moscow